The Groves of Academe (1952) is a novel by American writer Mary McCarthy. Considered to be one of the first academic novels, it concerns the sequence of events that take place after Henry Mulcahy, a literary instructor at the fictive Jocelyn College, learns that his teaching appointment will not be renewed. The novel is intended as a satire of academics based on the author's teaching experiences at Bard and Sarah Lawrence Colleges. The book is prefaced by a quote from Horace's Epistles, Atque inter silvas academi quaerere verum, which translates from the Latin as "And Seek for Truth in the Garden of Academus." The book's first chapter, "An Unexpected Letter," originally appeared in The New Yorker.

The work is written in the third person, omniscient narrative mode and begins from Henry Mulcahy's perspective, but later focuses on the perspectives of the other faculty members involved in the story, Domna Rejnev in particular.

Characters
Henry Mulcahy is the literature instructor and Joyce expert around whom the story revolves. Though portrayed at first as a sympathetic character, he is later revealed to be a highly manipulative, duplicitous, and self-serving individual.
Maynard Hoar is the President of Jocelyn College, and the man responsible for Mulcahy's dismissal.
Howard Furness is the chairman of Jocelyn's literature department.
Domna Rejnev, a young woman from Russia, is the youngest member of the literature department and the first of the faculty to hear of Mulcahy's woes.

Brief excerpt
". . . they had succeeded in leading him up the garden path into one of their academic mazes, where a man could wander for eternity, meeting himself in mirrors. No, he repeated. Possibly they were all very nice, high-minded, scrupulous people with only an occupational tendency towards backbiting and a nervous habit of self-correction, always emending, penciling, erasing; but he did not care to catch the bug, which seemed to be endemic to these ivied haunts."

References

Campus novels
Novels by Mary McCarthy
1952 American novels